The Council of Agriculture (COA) is the official government body in the Republic of China (Taiwan) under the Executive Yuan in charged with overseeing affairs related to agriculture, forestry, fishery, animal husbandry and food affairs. CAO is actively participating various FAO-led activities.

History
In 1912, the Ministry of Basic Industries was created after the establishment of the Provisional Government of the ROC. The ministry was in charge for agriculture, forestry, industry and commerce in China. After the Beiyang Government was established in the same year, the ministry was divided into two office, one is to oversee the agriculture and forestry, and the other is to oversee the industry and commerce. In 1914, the two offices reemerged to become the Ministry of Agriculture and Commerce.  In 1925, the Ministry of Basic Industries was installed but renamed to Ministry of Agriculture and Fishery. In 1930, the Ministry of Agriculture and Fishery and Ministry of Industry and Commerce were combined to form the Ministry of Basic Industries. In 1938, the ministry was changed to Ministry of Economic Affairs with the Department of Agriculture and Forestry was placed under it. In 1940, the department was expanded to become Ministry of Agriculture and Forestry. In 1941, the ministry was changed to Agriculture and Forestry Administration.

On the other hand, there was the Sino-American Joint Commission on Rural Reconstruction (JCRR) established in Nanking in 1948.  After the Kuomintang's defeat in the Chinese Civil War in 1949, which saw the government evacuated to Taiwan, the JCRR moved there. That same year,  the Department of Agriculture was created under the Ministry of Economic Affairs (MOEA) in which it was later renamed to Department of Agriculture and Forestry. In November 1981, the Department of Agriculture and Forestry was upgraded to Agriculture Bureau of the MOEA.

In 1978, the JCRR was changed to the Council for Agricultural Planning and Development  (CAPD) under the Executive Yuan. On 20 July 1984, both of the CAPD and the Agriculture Bureau were merged to become the Council of Agriculture. In May 2022, the Executive Yuan approved the proposal to update the council to become a ministry named Ministry of Agriculture.

Organization structures
 Department of Planning
 Department of Animal Industry
 Department of Farmers’ Services
 Department of International Affairs
 Department of Science and Technology
 Department of Irrigation and Engineering
 Secretariat
 Personnel Office
 Accounting Office
 Civil Service Ethics Office
 Legal Affairs Committee
 Petitions and Appeals Committee
 Information Management Center

Agencies

 Agriculture and Food Agency
 North Region Branch
 Central Region Branch
 Southern Region Branch
 Eastern Region Branch
 Fisheries Agency
 Bureau of Animal and Plant Health Inspection and Quarantine
 Keelung Branch
 Hsinchu Branch
 Taichung Branch
 Kaohsiung Branch
 Bureau of Agricultural Finance
 Forestry Bureau
 Luodong Forest District Office
 Hsinchu Forest District Office
 Dongshi Forest District Office
 Nantou Forest District Office
 Chiayi Forest District Office
 Pingtung Forest District Office
 Taitung Forest District Office
 Hualien Forest District Office
 Aerial Survey Office
 Soil and Water Conservation Bureau
 First Engineering Office
 Second Engineering Office
 Third Engineering Office
 Fourth Engineering Office
 Fifth Engineering Office
 Sixth Engineering Office
 Taiwan Agricultural Research institute
 Taiwan Forestry Research Institute
 Fisheries Research Institute
 Taiwan Livestock Research Institute
 Taitung Animal Propagation Station
 Animal Health Research Institute
 Animal Drugs Inspection Branch
 Taiwan Agricultural Chemicals and Toxic Substances Research Institute
 Endemic Species Research Institute
 Taoyuan District Agricultural Research and Extension Station
 Miaoli District Agricultural Research and Extension Station
 Taichung District Agricultural Research and Extension Station
 Tainan District Agricultural Research and Extension Station
 Kaohsiung District Agricultural Research and Extension Station
 Hualien District Agricultural Research and Extension Station
 Tea Research and Extension Station
 Taiwan Seed Improvement and Propagation Station
 Preparatory Office of Pingtung Agricultural Biotechnology Park

Ministers

Political Party:

Access
The council is accessible within walking distance West from Chiang Kai-shek Memorial Hall Station of the Taipei Metro.

See also
 Agriculture in Taiwan
 Economy of Taiwan

References

1984 establishments in Taiwan
Executive Yuan
Government agencies established in 1984
Councils of the Republic of China
Agriculture ministries